USS Edsall (DE-129) was the lead ship of her class of destroyer escort in the United States Navy. She was the second Navy ship named in honor of Seaman Norman Edsall (1873–1899).

Edsall was laid down by the Consolidated Steel Corporation at Orange, Texas on 2 July 1942; launched 1 November 1942; sponsored by Mrs. Bessie Edsall Bracey, sister of Seaman Edsall; and commissioned 10 April 1943.

History
Edsall was a schoolship at Norfolk, 20 June to 6 August 1943, for pre-commissioning crews of escort vessels, then served at Miami with the Submarine Chaser Training Center.  In March 1944, she joined a tanker convoy at Galveston, Texas, assigned to Escort Division 59, whose flagship she became 24 March.  Edsall continued escort duty from the Gulf of Mexico to New York City and Norfolk, and with one convoy to NS Argentia, Newfoundland.  In May, she sailed to Bermuda for antisubmarine warfare tests using a captured Italian submarine.

Between 1 July 1944 and 3 June 1945, she ranged Atlantic sealanes guarding seven convoys carrying the very lifeblood to the Mediterranean and Britain.  While escorting the sixth convoy en route to New York from Liverpool on 10 April 1945, Edsall along with other escorts were quick to come to the assistance of two tankers in the convoy who had collided.  Edsall searched for survivors and helped extinguish fires which broke out.

Edsall sailed for the Pacific on 24 June 1945, but World War II ended while she was training at Pearl Harbor, and she returned East.  She was placed out of commission in reserve at Green Cove Springs, Florida, on 11 June 1946.

Edsall was stricken from the Naval Vessel Register on 1 June 1968, and sold for scrap in July 1969.

References

External links  
    navsource.org: USS Edsall
 hazegray.org: USS Edsall
 

Edsall-class destroyer escorts
Ships built in Orange, Texas
1942 ships